Üçtepe, formerly Kerh or Kerh-i Dicle, is a village in the Bismil District of Diyarbakır Province in Turkey. In 1861, the Kurkh Monoliths were discovered here.

References

Villages in Bismil District